Plaza Bolivar may refer to:

Plaza Bolívar, Bogotá, Colombia
Plaza Bolívar, Lima, Peru
Many public squares in Venezuela including:
Plaza Bolívar (Caracas)
Plaza Bolívar (Valencia)